WCIM (104.9 FM) is a radio station broadcasting a Christian radio format from Family Life Network. Licensed to Montour Falls, New York, United States, the station serves the Elmira-Corning area. The station is owned by Family Life Ministries.

History
In 2020, WNGZ moved to the 93.1 frequency (with the WNGZ calls parked on AM 1490 in Watkins Glen) and tweaked to a full blown active rock format using the moniker The New Rock Edge. On July 3, 2020, WNGZ changed its callsign to WPHD and flipped to classic hits as part of a five-station frequency swap.

In June 2021, WPHD changed its format from classic hits (which moved to WGMM 98.7 FM Corning) to Family Life Network's religious format under new WCIM calls.

Previous logo

References

External links

CIM
Schuyler County, New York
Radio stations established in 1973
1973 establishments in New York (state)